Wife Number Two is a 1917 American silent drama film feature directed and written by William Nigh. The film starred Valeska Suratt, vamp rival to Theda Bara on the Fox lot, and was Suratt's penultimate silent film performance. The film is now considered lost.

Cast
 Valeska Suratt - Emma Rolfe
 Eric Mayne - Dr. Charles Bovar
 Mathilde Brundage - His Mother
 John Goldworthy - Rudolph Bulwer
 Martin J. Faust - Philip 
 T.J. Lawler - Leo 
 Peter Lang - Lhereux
 Dan Mason - Old Soldier
 William Burton - Priest
 Dan Sullivan - Lhereux's Son
 L.F. Kennedy - Heminway

See also
1937 Fox vault fire

References

External links
 
 

1917 films
1917 drama films
Fox Film films
Silent American drama films
American silent feature films
American black-and-white films
Lost American films
Films directed by William Nigh
1917 lost films
Lost drama films
1910s American films